Achinsk Airport  is an air base in Krasnoyarsk Krai, Russia located  east of Achinsk.  It is a civilian airfield with minor facilities for small number of fighter aircraft. One source lists the 712th Guards Fighter Aviation Regiment at Kansk but lists Achinsk as a diversionary airfield.

Recent developments
On 30 March 2012, the new manager of the airport Valeri Gusarov has outlined his plans for the future of the airport, including making airport operations all year round rather than seasonal and expanding the operations beyond the Krasnoyarsk region.

References

Soviet Air Defence Force bases
Russian Air Force bases
Airports built in the Soviet Union
Airports in Krasnoyarsk Krai